Pharmacy is the science and technique of preparing and dispensing medicines.

A pharmacy (shop) is also a place where medication is dispensed, or a prescription drug-dispensing operation, most commonly a community pharmacy.

Other meanings include:
 The Pharmacy, Seattle indie rock band
 Pharmacy (album), a 2015 album by Galantis
 Pharmacy (restaurant), the defunct restaurant in Notting Hill, London
 Pharmacy Records, a record label